Ivan Avanethan is a 1960 Indian Tamil-language film directed by P. Sridhar. The film stars Udhayakumar and Ambika.

Plot 
Muthu is an uneducated village lad. He is in love with his aunt's daughter Malini. Malini has no father and was brought up by her mother. But she is wealthy and well educated. She hates Muthu. Sundar is a playboy type of person. He is married to Lakshmi. He also has a lover, Prema. Sundar eyes Malini's beauty and wealth. He entices her to become a stage actress. Sundar is waiting for an opportunity to get her and her wealth into his fold. Muthu is an obstacle for his plans. There is a psychiatrist called Dr. Gunabhushanam. Muthu, Malini, Sundar, Lakshmi, and Prema all go to his clinic for treatment. He studies each case and understands the situation. How he cured everyone and solve all problems forms the rest of the story.

Cast 
The following lists are adapted from Film News Anandan's database.

Udhayakumar
S. V. Sahasranamam
K. Sarangapani
Pandaribai
Ambika
Devika
A. K. Veerasamy
S. N. Lakshmi
Rajamani
Uma

Soundtrack 
The Music was composed by M. Ranga Rao while the lyrics were penned by Thanjai N. Ramaiah Dass, M. S. Subramaniam, Kalaipithan, Villiputhan and Kovai Sabapathy.

Reception 
Ivan Avanethan was a box office success, but no print of it is known to survive, making it a lost film.

References

External links 

1960 drama films
1960 films
1960s lost films
Films scored by M. Ranga Rao
Indian drama films
Lost drama films
Lost Indian films
1960s Tamil-language films